Park Jae-chan (Korean: 박재찬; born December 6, 2001), also known mononymously as Jaechan (Korean: 재찬), is a South Korean singer-songwriter and actor. He is a member of the K-pop boy group DKZ and its sub-unit Dongkiz I:Kan. As an actor, he is best known for his portrayal of Chu Sang-woo in the web novel-adapted drama series Semantic Error.

Early life and education 
Park Jae-chan was born on December 6, 2001, in Daegu, South Korea. His interest in music began in middle school upon hearing Justin Bieber's songs. During high school, Jaechan received his GED and became a trainee.

In 2022, he entered the Department of Broadcasting and Entertainment at Global Cyber University together with his fellow members.

Career

Musical career 

Jaechan officially debuted as a member of Dongkiz with the release of their single album, Dongkiz on the Block, on April 24, 2019. He is known as the rapper of Dongkiz. Jaechan also wrote and produce several songs for the group.

On July 7, 2020, Jaechan alongside fellow Dongkiz member Munik formed the sub-group Dongkiz I:Kan. The group debuted with the single album Y.O.U.

Jaechan's group rebranded from Dongkiz to DKZ on March 18, 2022. It was also during this time that his rise to fame courtesy of his BL drama, Semantic Error, had led the group to increase its album sales and popularity.

Acting career 
In 2019, Jaechan got his first main role in a Tooniverse web drama, My YouTube Diary, along with his co-member, Munik.

On January 12, 2022, South Korean streaming television series Watcha announced that Park Jae-chan would take the lead role in the live series adaptation of BL web novel Semantic Error. The popularity of the series led to a surge in support for DKZ. In April 2022, Jaechan was included in  Forbes Korea's 2022 Korea Power Celebrity 40 - Rising Star for the attention he gained for his portrayal in Semantic Error.

Discography

Music credits 
Music credits adapted from the Korea Music Copyright Association's database, unless otherwise noted.

Filmography

Film

Television series

Web series

Television show

Web show

Radio show

Awards and nominations

Listicles

Notes

References

External links 
 
 

2001 births
K-pop singers
South Korean male singer-songwriters
South Korean male actors
South Korean pop singers
21st-century South Korean male actors
21st-century South Korean male singers
South Korean male idols
Living people
People from Daegu
South Korean male television actors
South Korean male singers